The Bautek Milan Racer is a German high-wing, single-place, hang glider designed and produced by Bautek.

Design and development
The Milan Racer was the company's competition glider in the early 2000s and was replaced in production by the Fizz.

The aircraft is made from tubing, with the wing covered in polyester sailcloth. Its  span wing is a "topless" design, lacking kingpost and the associated flying wires. The nose angle is 130° and the aspect ratio is 7.7:1.

The aircraft is DHV certified.

Specifications (Milan Racer)

References

Hang gliders